Nagendra Kumar Mothukuri is an Indian Cinematographer and Film Director working predominantly in  Telugu cinema. His notable movies as a Cinematographer include Edurinti Mogudu Pakkinti Pellam, Ibbara Naduve Muddina Aata,  Raja, Geluvina Saradara and Brahmachari Mogudu. As a director he is known for Suhasini starrer Ullamellam Thalladuthey, and Naa Girlfriend Baaga Rich.

As a cinematographer he has worked for more than 95 Feature films, and 45 Telefilms across many Indian languages including Telugu, Hindi, Bengali, Kannada, Bihari, Marathi, Urdu and Odia.

Career

As a Cinematographer
Nagendra Kumar made his debut as a director of photography with the movie Srivari Chindulu. He worked as a director of photography more than 95 films including the movie Eluka Majaka.
He also worked for more than 45 telefilms and television serials including Telugu television puppet show Panchatantram on ETV.

As a Film Director
In the year 2006, Nagendra Kumar made his directorial debut with the Telugu movie Tanu  starring Suhasini, Archana and Sivaji Raja. He also directed Sivaji Kaveri Jha starrer Naa Girlfriend Baaga Rich  and remade his debut film in Tamil as Ullamellam Thalladuthey.

Filmography

Director
 Ullamellam Thalladuthey
 Naa Girl Friend Baaga Rich
 Tanu

Cinematographer
 Eluka Majaka
 Ullamellam Thalladuthey
 Naa Girl Friend Baaga Rich
 Half Fry
 Aadab Hyderabad
 Tanu 
 Back Pocket
 Aadab Hyderabad
 Lagna Patrika
 Pichodi Chetilo Rayi
 Samakka Sarakka
 Ulta Palta
 Chinni Chinni Aasa
 Naagashakthi
 High-class Aththa Low-class Allullu
 Raja
 Geluvina Saradara
 Ibbara Naduve Muddina Aata
 Sundara Vadana Subbalakshmi Moguda
 Ketu Duplicatu
 Parugo Parugu
 Brahmachari Mogudu
 Idandi Mavaari Varasa
 Akka Pethanam Chellela Kaapuram
 Mama Kodalu
 Chillara Mogudu Allari Koduku
 Pellam Chaatu Mogudu
 Samsaraala Mechanic
 Edurinti Mogudu Pakkinti Pellam
 Sri Vaari Chindulu

References

Living people
Telugu film cinematographers
Telugu film directors
Year of birth missing (living people)